"Angel" is a song recorded by American group Fifth Harmony for their self-titled third studio album (2017). The song was written and produced by Skrillex and Poo Bear. It was released as the first promotional single from the record on August 10, 2017.

Composition
"Angel" was described by Mike Wass from Idolator writing that it finds the group veering "deep into hip hop territory." Its production is supported by heavy bassline, drum machine sound, "squiggly synths" and distorted vocal samples. The song is about being in a relationship based on unrealistic expectations. As MTV News's writer Madeline Roth commented, the group are "warning that they have no problem shrugging off a fuckboy if it needs to be." The group delivers a half-rapped performance on the first and second verses of the song, while in the chorus, they raise a rhetorical question: "When you look at me, what do you see? / Open your eyes, I’m more brilliant than you’ll ever be / Who said I was an angel?” The group continue to ask the same question throughout the record, as Rachael Ellenbogen from International Business Times commented.

Critical reception

Sadie Bell from Billboard considered "Angel" as a "different direction" for the group describing it as "a bit harder than their more recent releases." Madeline Roth of MTV News praised its production and felt that "Angel" is "less poppier" than Fifth Harmony's previous single “Down", providing a "harder backdrop for their brassiness."

Music video
The song's official music video was released on August 11, 2017 and directed by David Camarena. The clip opens in a dimly lit setting, featuring a man who's been dreaming, then it features the group in an entirely new light, in which they are revealed to be the subject of the man's dream, tormenting those of someone who has wronged them, complete with flashing images and dark VCR filters and neon lighting aesthetics.

Charts

References

2017 singles
2017 songs
Fifth Harmony songs
Epic Records singles
Syco Music singles
Songs written by Poo Bear
Songs written by Skrillex
Trap music songs